Abdurahman Al-Korbi (born 18 August 1994) is a Qatari footballer. He currently plays for Al-Rayyan.

References

External links
 

Qatari footballers
1994 births
Living people
Al-Rayyan SC players
Qatar Stars League players
Qatari Second Division players
Association football midfielders